The 2012–13 NBA season was the 67th season of the National Basketball Association (NBA). The regular season began on October 30, 2012, when the 2011–12 NBA champions Miami Heat started the season by hosting the Boston Celtics. The 2013 NBA All-Star Game was played on February 17, 2013, at Toyota Center in Houston, Texas. The regular season ended on April 17, 2013, and the playoffs began on April 20, 2013 and ended on June 20, 2013, with the Miami Heat defeating the San Antonio Spurs in seven games to win the 2013 NBA Finals.

Transactions

Free agency
Free agency negotiation started on July 1, 2012, with players being able to sign starting July 11, after the July moratorium ended.

Coaching changes

Off-season
On April 30, 2012, the Charlotte Bobcats released Paul Silas from his coaching contract. On June 20, the Charlotte Bobcats hired Mike Dunlap as head coach.
On May 21, 2012, the Orlando Magic fired head coach Stan Van Gundy. On July 28, the Orlando Magic hired Jacque Vaughn as head coach.
On August 8, 2012, the Portland Trail Blazers hired Terry Stotts as head coach, and demoted Kaleb Canales back to assistant head coach.

In-season
On November 9, 2012, the Los Angeles Lakers fired Mike Brown after starting the season 1–4 and named Bernie Bickerstaff as interim head coach. This was one of the earliest regular season head coach firings in NBA history. On November 12, 2012, the Lakers hired Mike D'Antoni as official head coach and demoted Bickerstaff back to an assistant head coach.
On December 27, 2012, the Brooklyn Nets fired Avery Johnson after losing 10 out of 13 games in December, which came right after winning the Eastern Conference's Coach of the Month award in November. The team promoted assistant P. J. Carlesimo as interim head coach.
On January 8, 2013, the Milwaukee Bucks and Scott Skiles mutually agreed to part ways after starting the season with a 16–16 record. The team promoted assistant Jim Boylan as interim head coach.
On January 18, 2013, the Phoenix Suns and Alvin Gentry mutually agreed to part ways. The Suns' 13–28 record at the time of Gentry's departure was the worst in the Western Conference. The team promoted assistant and development coach Lindsey Hunter as interim head coach.

Preseason
The preseason started on October 5, 2012, and ended on October 26, 2012.

NBA Europe Live 2012 was played October 5 – 7 and 9, 2012 featuring the Boston Celtics, Dallas Mavericks,  and teams from Europe (Fenerbahçe Ülker, Alba Berlin, Olimpia Milano and Regal FC Barcelona). The Miami Heat defeated the Los Angeles Clippers at the sixth annual NBA China Games on October 11 in Beijing. A second game took place on October 14 in Shanghai. On October 7, the NBA Mexico Games 2012 were played between the New Orleans Hornets and Orlando Magic. Finally, the NBA Canada Series was played on October 19 between the Toronto Raptors and New York Knicks in Montreal, and on October 24 between the Minnesota Timberwolves and Detroit Pistons in Winnipeg.

Regular season
The regular season started on October 30, 2012, when the 2011–12 NBA champions Miami Heat defeated the Boston Celtics 120–107. The regular season ended on April 17, 2013. The entire schedule was released on July 26, 2012.

For the first time since 2008, the NBA did not schedule any Thanksgiving games. The NBA's annual Christmas games featured, in chronological order, the Boston Celtics at the Brooklyn Nets, the New York Knicks at the Los Angeles Lakers, the Oklahoma City Thunder at the Miami Heat, the Houston Rockets at the Chicago Bulls, and the Denver Nuggets at the Los Angeles Clippers (thus the Staples Center was in the rare situation of hosting two NBA games on the same day).

A regular season game took place at the O2 Arena in London, United Kingdom between the Detroit Pistons and the New York Knicks on January 17, 2013. The Knicks won the game 102–87.

Standings

By division

Eastern Conference

Western Conference

By conference

Notes
z – Clinched home court advantage for the entire playoffs
c – Clinched home court advantage for the conference playoffs
y – Clinched division title
x – Clinched playoff spot
 – In the aftermath of the Boston Marathon bombing, the NBA canceled the April 16 game scheduled in Boston between the Celtics and the Pacers; the game was not rescheduled because it would have had no impact on either team's playoff seedings.

Tiebreakers

Western Conference
 The Los Angeles Clippers clinched #4 seed over Memphis as the Clippers won the Pacific Division and the Grizzlies finished second in the Southwest Division. Also, the Clippers secured home court advantage over the Grizzlies based on head-to-head record (3–1).
 The Los Angeles Lakers clinched #7 seed over Houston based on winning percentage against Western Conference teams (the Lakers' .538 to the Rockets' .462).

Playoffs

The playoffs began on April 20, 2013, and concluded with the 2013 NBA Finals, which began on June 6 between the Miami Heat and the San Antonio Spurs

Bracket

Statistics leaders

Individual statistic leaders

Individual game highs

Team statistic leaders

Awards

Yearly awards

Most Valuable Player: LeBron James, Miami Heat
Defensive Player of the Year: Marc Gasol, Memphis Grizzlies
Rookie of the Year: Damian Lillard, Portland Trail Blazers
Sixth Man of the Year: J. R. Smith, New York Knicks
Most Improved Player: Paul George, Indiana Pacers
Coach of the Year: George Karl, Denver Nuggets
Executive of the Year: Masai Ujiri, Denver Nuggets
Sportsmanship Award: Jason Kidd, New York Knicks
J. Walter Kennedy Citizenship Award: Kenneth Faried, Denver Nuggets
Twyman–Stokes Teammate of the Year Award: Chauncey Billups, Los Angeles Clippers

All-NBA First Team:
 F Kevin Durant, Oklahoma City Thunder 
 F LeBron James, Miami Heat
 C Tim Duncan, San Antonio Spurs
 G Kobe Bryant, Los Angeles Lakers
 G Chris Paul, Los Angeles Clippers

All-NBA Second Team:
 F Carmelo Anthony, New York Knicks
 F Blake Griffin, Los Angeles Clippers
 C Marc Gasol, Memphis Grizzlies
 G Russell Westbrook, Oklahoma City Thunder 
 G Tony Parker, San Antonio Spurs

All-NBA Third Team:
 F Paul George, Indiana Pacers
 F David Lee, Golden State Warriors
 C Dwight Howard, Los Angeles Lakers
 G James Harden, Houston Rockets
 G Dwyane Wade, Miami Heat

NBA All-Defensive First Team:
 F LeBron James, Miami Heat 
 F Serge Ibaka, Oklahoma City Thunder
 C Joakim Noah, Chicago Bulls
 C Tyson Chandler, New York Knicks
 G Tony Allen, Memphis Grizzlies
 G Chris Paul, Los Angeles Clippers

NBA All-Defensive Second Team:
 F Paul George, Indiana Pacers
 F Tim Duncan, San Antonio Spurs
 C Marc Gasol, Memphis Grizzlies
 G Avery Bradley, Boston Celtics
 G Mike Conley, Memphis Grizzlies

NBA All-Rookie First Team:
 Damian Lillard, Portland Trail Blazers
 Bradley Beal, Washington Wizards
 Anthony Davis, New Orleans Hornets
 Dion Waiters, Cleveland Cavaliers
 Harrison Barnes, Golden State Warriors

NBA All-Rookie Second Team:
 Andre Drummond, Detroit Pistons
 Jonas Valančiūnas, Toronto Raptors
 Michael Kidd-Gilchrist, Charlotte Bobcats
 Kyle Singler, Detroit Pistons
 Tyler Zeller, Cleveland Cavaliers

Players of the week
The following players were named the Eastern and Western Conference Players of the Week.

Players of the month
The following players were named the Eastern and Western Conference Players of the Month.

Rookies of the month
The following players were named the Eastern and Western Conference Rookies of the Month.

Coaches of the month
The following coaches were named the Eastern and Western Conference Coaches of the Month.

Notable occurrences
The New Jersey Nets moved to Brooklyn and became the Brooklyn Nets, returning to the state the team played in when it first joined the NBA from the ABA back in 1976. The Nets now play at the Barclays Center. The first game there would have pitted the Nets against the New York Knicks on November 1, but due to the damage caused by Hurricane Sandy, it was postponed to November 26. Instead the Nets opened the new season in Brooklyn against the Toronto Raptors on November 3, winning the game by a score of 107–100.
The Sacramento Kings' home arena, the Power Balance Pavilion, was renamed the Sleep Train Arena on November 1. The arena's naming rights were acquired by The Sleep Train mattress company in the wake of Power Balance's legal issues and eventual bankruptcy.
The center position in the All-Star Game player balloting was eliminated, beginning with the 2013 game, citing a more perimeter-oriented game and increased use of smaller, faster lineups. Fans can now selected three generic frontcourt players in addition to any two guards.
The Orlando Magic traded franchise star center Dwight Howard to the Los Angeles Lakers. The Lakers then sent Andrew Bynum to the Philadelphia 76ers, who in turn sent Andre Iguodala to the Denver Nuggets. Another trade also netted the Lakers franchise star point guard Steve Nash from the Phoenix Suns, who in turn sent them four total draft picks.
In the last trade before entering the regular season, the Oklahoma City Thunder sent Sixth Man of the Year James Harden, Daequan Cook, Lazar Hayward and Cole Aldrich to the Houston Rockets in exchange for Kevin Martin, Jeremy Lamb, and three future draft picks.
On November 30, 2012, the San Antonio Spurs were fined $250,000 for sitting out Tim Duncan, Tony Parker, Manu Ginóbili and Danny Green prior to a nationally televised Thursday game against the Miami Heat, citing as an act "detrimental to fan interest and to the league".
On December 5, 2012, Kobe Bryant became the 5th player (Kareem Abdul-Jabbar, Karl Malone, Michael Jordan, and Wilt Chamberlain) all time and the fourth Laker (Chamberlain, Abdul-Jabbar, and Malone) to score 30,000 career points in NBA history, finishing the game with 29 points against the New Orleans Hornets in a 103–87 win. His teammate Metta World Peace also became the 6th player (Gary Payton, Reggie Miller, Jason Kidd, Paul Pierce, and Bryant) all to record 12,000 points, 4,000 rebounds, 1,500 steals, and 1,000 3-pointers made.
On December 21, 2012, the Denver Nuggets shot a record-low 0–22 from the three–point area in a 101–93 loss to the Portland Trail Blazers, who originally held that record by going 0–20 a week prior.
 On January 8, 2013, Steve Nash became the fifth player to reach 10,000 career assists.
 On January 12, 2013, the Phoenix Suns became the fourth fastest NBA team (tenth team overall) to gain 2,000 total victories in the regular season (with the only faster teams being the Minneapolis/Los Angeles Lakers, Boston Celtics, and Syracuse Nationals/Philadelphia 76ers), with a 97–81 road victory against the Chicago Bulls.
 On January 16, 2013, LeBron James became the youngest player to reach 20,000 career points, while also reaching 5,000 assists in the same game.
 On January 27, 2013, Dirk Nowitzki passed Allen Iverson for 18th place on the NBA's all-time scoring list in a 110–95 victory over the Phoenix Suns. Shawn Marion also played his 1,000th game in the NBA against the team that first drafted him back in 1999, which was a pick that, ironically, was first owned by Dallas.
 On January 30, 2013, the Memphis Grizzlies participated in a three-way trade that sent their leading scorer Rudy Gay and Hamed Haddadi to the Toronto Raptors, with Toronto trading José Calderón to the Detroit Pistons in exchange for Memphis gaining Toronto's Ed Davis, Detroit's Austin Daye, and Detroit's Tayshaun Prince.
 On February 18, 2013, Los Angeles Lakers' owner Jerry Buss died at age 80 at 5:55 a.m. after being hospitalized at Cedars-Sinai Medical Center with an undisclosed form of cancer. His immediate cause of death was listed as kidney failure. After the All-star break vs the Boston Celtics, the Lakers debut their uniforms with the Patch of the initials "JB" in honor of Buss.
 On February 27, 2013, Tim Duncan became the 15th player to reach 13,000 career rebounds in a 105–101 overtime loss to the Phoenix Suns. The Suns would also end an 18-game home winning streak favoring the San Antonio Spurs. 
 On February 27, 2013, Stephen Curry scored 54 points but his Warriors lost to the Knicks, 109–105. He shot 18 for 28 from the field, making a Warriors franchise-record 11 three-pointers on 11 of 13 shooting from 3-point range. The 54 points Curry had was the third highest total by a Knicks opponent in the current Madison Square Garden, trailing Kobe Bryant's 61 points on February 2, 2009, and Michael Jordan's 55 points on March 28, 1995. His 54 points were the most anyone recorded in the 2012–13 season. The 11 3-pointers were good for second most all-time in a game, 1 behind the record 12 made by Bryant (1/7/03) and Donyell Marshall (3/13/05).
 On February 28, 2013, Vince Carter moved to 23rd on the all-time scoring list.
 In a March 12, 2013 game against his former team, the Orlando Magic, Los Angeles Laker Dwight Howard tied his own NBA record of 39 free throw attempts.  He made 25 of the 39 attempts.  He had previously set the league mark with 39 free throw attempts in a game while playing for the Orlando Magic vs. the Golden State Warriors on January 12, 2012.
 On March 22, 2013, Gregg Popovich became the second head coach in NBA history besides Jerry Sloan to win 900 games with one team as the San Antonio Spurs defeated the Utah Jazz. Tim Duncan would also surpass Shaquille O'Neal to become the 13th all-time rebounding leader.
 On March 27, 2013, the Chicago Bulls ended Miami Heat's 27–game winning streak which began on February 3 when the Heat defeated the Toronto Raptors 100–85. The Bulls won the game 101–97. It was second longest in NBA history, only surpassed by the Lakers' 33-game winning streak in the 1971–72 season until the Golden State Warriors' 28-game winning streak in 2015.
 On March 30, 2013, Kobe Bryant moved to 4th on the all-time scoring list, passing Wilt Chamberlain in a 103–98 victory against the Sacramento Kings.
 On April 6, 2013, Rick Adelman became the eighth head coach in NBA history to win 1,000 games as a head coach. This came as the Minnesota Timberwolves defeated the Detroit Pistons 107–101.
 On April 17, 2013, in the Warriors' regular season finale against the Portland Trail Blazers, Stephen Curry broke the NBA single-season record for most 3-pointers with his 270th of the season. The previous record was held by Ray Allen who had 269 in 2005–2006 with the Seattle SuperSonics. Curry added 2 more 3-pointers to finish the season with 272 in 600 attempts, 53 less than Allen attempted to set his record. Curry and teammate Klay Thompson set the record for most 3-pointers by a duo with 483, 48 more than the previous record.
 The Dallas Mavericks are eliminated from making the playoffs for the first time since 2000, ending their 12-year streak. They lost to the Phoenix Suns 102–91 and were eliminated a few hours later when the Los Angeles Lakers won against the Portland Trail Blazers 113–106.
 The 2013 Boston Marathon bombing led to the cancellation of the game between the Indiana Pacers and the Boston Celtics, which was originally scheduled for April 16. As both teams' playoff positions were already set, the game was not rescheduled, instead they will force to have a bye. Both teams finished the season with only 81 regular season games, making it the first time in 58 seasons that some teams played more regular season games than others.
 Dwight Howard led the league in defensive rebounds for the sixth consecutive season and sixth season overall in his career, both league records.  He led the NBA in defensive rebounds every season starting with the  season.
 In the cover story of the May 6, 2013 issue of Sports Illustrated, written by Jason Collins himself and posted on the magazine's website on April 29, 2013, he came out as gay, becoming the first active male athlete from one of the four major American professional team sports to publicly do so.
In turn, the team then known as the Charlotte Bobcats would reclaim the Pelicans' former name and records from the original team's tenure in the Queen City, but it would also keep its own records from its  founding up to this point.

Notes

References

 
NBA
2012–13 in Canadian basketball